Margarita Diéguez Armas is a Mexican diplomat, and a former Ambassador of Mexico to the United Nations and Chairman of UNICEF.

She has served as Mexico's Ambassador to Tanzania, the OPANAL, Bolivia and the Netherlands. From 1989 to 1992 she was Mexico's Ambassador to the United Nations. She has also served as Director of Multilateral Relations in the Secretariat of Foreign Affairs. She was Chairman of the UNICEF Executive Board at the international level from 1989 to 1990.

References

Chairmen and Presidents of UNICEF
Mexican women ambassadors
Mexican officials of the United Nations
Permanent Representatives of Mexico to the United Nations
Ambassadors of Mexico to Tanzania
Ambassadors of Mexico to the Netherlands
Ambassadors of Mexico to Bolivia